Li Xiaoxue (born 11 January 1980) is a Chinese former track and field athlete who competed in the hammer throw. She succeeded her compatriot Gu Yuan with that title and started a long period of Chinese dominance in that event. Li placed third at the 2001 National Games of China, finishing behind Gu and Liu Yinghui.

International competitions

References

External links

1980 births
Living people
Chinese female hammer throwers
Asian Athletics Championships winners
20th-century Chinese women
21st-century Chinese women